Oxford Economic Papers is a peer reviewed academic journal of general economics published by Oxford University Press.

References 

Oxford University Press academic journals
Economics journals
English-language journals